Jane Chalmers (born 10 March 1983) is an Australian professional basketball player who plays for the Bendigo Spirit in the Women's National Basketball League.

Professional career

College
Chalmers began her college career at Iowa Central Community College in Fort Dodge, Iowa for the Iowa Central Tritons, from 2000–2002. After strong showings, Chalmers transferred to Northwest Missouri State University in Maryville, Missouri with the Bearcats, in NCAA Division II.

WNBL
After strong showings with Bendigo in the SEABL, Chalmers was invited to attend training with the incoming WNBL side, the Bendigo Spirit. Chalmers then made her professional debut with the Spirit in 2007. She has since been a consistent member of the Spirit roster. With the Spirit, she has won two Championships in 2013 and 2014, led by the likes of Kristi Harrower, Gabrielle Richards and Kelsey Griffin.

References

1983 births
Living people
Australian women's basketball players
Sportswomen from Victoria (Australia)
Guards (basketball)